John Tasker (4 February 1887 – 24 August 1975) was an English amateur first-class cricketer, who played in thirty three first-class matches between 1912 and 1919.

Born in South Kirkby, Yorkshire, England, Tasker was a right-handed batsman who scored 644 runs at 14.97, with a best of 67 for Yorkshire County Cricket Club against Cambridge University. He also scored half centuries against Nottinghamshire and Leicestershire. He bowled two overs which cost sixteen runs.

All but two of his first-class games were played for Yorkshire before World War I, with his two appearances in 1919 coming for the Army and the Army and Navy combined side.

Tasker died, aged 88, in August 1975 at Greenham Common, Berkshire, England.

References

External links
Cricinfo Profile
Cricket Archive Statistics

1887 births
1975 deaths
Yorkshire cricketers
People from South Kirkby
English cricketers
Military personnel from Yorkshire
British Army cricketers
Army and Navy cricketers
Cricketers from Yorkshire
British Army personnel of World War I